Tony Wood may refer to:

 Tony Wood (producer), television producer
 Tony Wood (musician) (born 1961), American Christian musician
 Tony Wood (Australian businessman), Australian businessman
 Tony Wood (British businessman) (born 1966), British businessman
 Tony Wood (historian), American historian of Russia